The Presbyterian Church in Korea (DokNoHoe II) is a Presbyterian denomination in South Korea. Leadership issue went to the split of the Presbyterian Church in Korea (DokNoHoe). The Moderator of the Presbyterian Church in Korea Ahn Mo-Myung went to the United States in 1981 Pastor Chung Nam-Young acted as proxy. The General assembly of the DokNoHoe church elected Rev. Pastor Yoo Yong-Hyun as moderator. Rev. Chung Nam-Young and Rev. Bang Byung-Duk withdrew from DokNoHoe and formed the DokNoHoe II. In 2004 it had 4,000 members and 25 congregations. Women are not ordained. The church subscribes the Apostles Creed and the Westminster Confession.

References 

Presbyterian denominations in South Korea
Presbyterian denominations in Asia